Chinonso Ukah (born May 27, 1996) is a Nigerian comedienne, influencer and actress, known by her stage name Nons Minaj or Ada Jesus.

Personal life
Chinonso Ukah was born in Abia State, Nigeria. She had her secondary education at Command Secondary School and studied at Babcock University where she earned an MBA in Public Administration.

Career

Movie
She took part in the Next Movie Star, Nigerian TV reality show and became first runner-up.
Chinonso began her acting career in the mid 2015, starring in Nollywood horror film "Quiet". She began full time acting in 2017, after gaining admission into the university. 
She has also featured in several other Nollywood movies including, Imperfect (2019) Pandora's Box (2020), Our Wife (2019), The Third Wheel (2021), Hustle (2021), among others.

Comedy
Nons Minaj gained prominence in the comedy industry through the posting of her viral magical-mother skits on social media.

Some of her skits have featured Nigerian celebrities including Kanayo O. Kanayo, Don Jazzy, Peruzzi, among others.

Selected filmography
Quiet (2015)
Baby Palaver (2018)
Sex is Not The Answer (2018)
Cooked-Up Love (2018)
Imperfect  (2019) 
Our Wife  (2019)
The Alter Date (2019)
Time and Chance (2019)
Her Mother's Man (2019)
Different Strokes (2019)
Truth or Dead (2019)
Pandora's Box (2020)
The Third Wheel  (2021)
Hustle (2021)
The Miracle Centre (2020)

References

External links 
  
 Chinonso Ukah on Flixanda
Chinonso Ukah Movies on IrokoTv
Chinonso Ukah Movie on Telerama France
 [Comedy Video] Nons Miraj – Ada Jesus Deals With Kanayo .O. Kanayo
 Nons Miraj – Peruzzi Was Shown A Little Of Adajesus’s Power (Comedy Video)

1996 births
Living people
Nigerian actresses
Nigerian women comedians
Nigerian media personalities
Babcock University alumni
Igbo actresses
21st-century Nigerian actresses
Nigerian Internet celebrities
Actresses from Abia State